Annemarie "Mirl" Buchner-Fischer (16 February 1924 – 9 November 2014) was a German Alpine skier. She was born in Ettal. At the 1952 Olympics in Oslo Buchner was silver medalist in the downhill, and bronze medalist in the slalom and in the giant slalom. She was also German Sportswoman of the Year in 1948. She died on 9 November 2014.

References

1924 births
2014 deaths
German female alpine skiers
Olympic alpine skiers of West Germany
Olympic alpine skiers of the United Team of Germany
Alpine skiers at the 1952 Winter Olympics
Alpine skiers at the 1956 Winter Olympics
Olympic silver medalists for West Germany
Olympic bronze medalists for West Germany
Olympic medalists in alpine skiing
Medalists at the 1952 Winter Olympics
20th-century German women